Ashley Marie Johnson Manso (born 4 January 1990) is an American-born Puerto Rican footballer who plays as a forward. She has been a member of the Puerto Rico women's national team. She is the older sister of fellow international player Kelley Johnson.

Early life
Johnson was raised in Springfield, Virginia.

International career
Johnson capped for Puerto Rico at senior level during the 2016 CONCACAF Women's Olympic Qualifying Championship.

References

1990 births
Living people
Women's association football forwards
Puerto Rican women's footballers
Puerto Rico women's international footballers
Puerto Rican people of African-American descent
American women's soccer players
Soccer players from Virginia
Sportspeople from Fairfax County, Virginia
People from Springfield, Virginia
African-American women's soccer players
American sportspeople of Puerto Rican descent
Radford Highlanders women's soccer players
21st-century African-American sportspeople
21st-century African-American women